EchoStar VIII was an American geostationary communications satellite which is operated by EchoStar. It is positioned in geostationary orbit at a longitude of 110° West, from where it is used to provide high-definition television direct broadcasting services to the Contiguous United States.

EchoStar VIII was built by Space Systems/Loral, and is based on the LS-1300 satellite bus. The launch occurred from Baikonur Cosmodrome on 22 August 2002.

The satellite experienced an anomaly on April 16, 2017, and was moved to the graveyard orbit.

See also

2002 in spaceflight

References

Spacecraft launched in 2002
Satellites using the SSL 1300 bus
Communications satellites in geostationary orbit
Spacecraft launched by Proton rockets
E08
Satellite television